The World Institute of Pain (WIP) is an international non-profit medical society for physicians practicing interventional pain medicine.  WIP was founded in 1993 by Phulchand Prithvi Raj, Serdar Erdine, Ricardo Ruiz Lopez, and Gabor B. Racz, all of whom are lifetime Council Members and lifetime Executive Board Members.  The organizational meeting was held in Los Angeles, California in 1994.  WIP is an international membership organization that was established to educate and train personnel of member pain centers by sponsoring symposiums, workshops, and world congresses that focus on pain management interventional techniques.

FIPP certification
In 2001, WIP began its Fellow of Interventional Pain Practice (FIPP) Board of Examination, a physician certification program that requires both a theoretical and practical examination.  There are certain requirements for pain physicians to qualify for an FIPP certification including American Board of Medical Specialties (ABMS) certification or equivalent, a mandatory subspecialty certification for candidates on either the American Board of Anesthesiology/Pain Management, or American Board of Pain Medicine, and clinical experience in addition to other requirements. As of the end of 2018, there are 1,125 pain physicians around the world who have obtained the FIPP designation.

CIPS certification
Certified Interventional Ultrasound Sonographer (CIPS) is a qualification issued by the World Institute of Pain (WIP) to pain physicians around the world to recognize his/her skills in using ultrasound for interventional pain management procedures. The CIPS is awarded after successful completion of the CIPS Examination administered by WIP. As of the end of 2018, there are 113 pain physicians who have obtained the CIPS designation.

Publications

The official scientific journal of the WIP is Pain Practice, established in 2001, which publishes information for pain management. In 2015, the journal had an impact factor of 2.361, ranking 13th out of 30 in the category 'Anesthesiology', and 93rd out of 192 in the category 'Clinical Neurology'.

In addition to Pain Practice, it also publishes a quarterly magazine, Pain Pathways, aimed towards patients and their caregivers, as well as the World Institute of Pain Newsletter.

WIP World Congresses
The 1st WIP World Congress was held in Eilat, Israel in 1998, and was chaired by David Niv, Professor of Medicine at the University of Tel Aviv. Other World Congresses followed in 2004, 2007, 2009, 2012, and 2014 which were held respectively in Turkey, Spain, Hungary, twice in the United States, and in The Netherlands. The 8th Congress is to be held in New York City on 20–23 May 2016. In addition to the customary social activities, lectures, and displays at such events, the World Congress also provides hands-on educational activities using cadavers. Approximately 2000–2500 physicians attend.

Excellence in Pain Practice Award
WIP created the Excellence in Pain Practice Award in 2010, to "promote the highest standards of pain practice around the world". The award is given to organizations and health centers. As of February 2016, there have been
 7 recipients in the category "Comprehensive Multidisciplinary Pain Practice"
 2 recipients in the category "Clinical Pain Practice"
 2 recipients in the category "Clinical Pain Practice Specializing in Musculoskeletal Pain Syndromes"
 13 recipients in the category "Multidisciplinary Clinical Pain Practice"

References

External links
 
 PainPathways website

Medical and health organizations based in North Carolina
Pain management